Westminster School of Oklahoma City is a private school in Oklahoma City, Oklahoma, United States that was founded in 1963, and admits children from 3 years old through 8th Grade.

Westminster School is accredited by the Independent Schools Association of the Southwest (ISAS) and the State of Oklahoma.

References

External links
 

Independent Schools Association of the Southwest
Private schools in Oklahoma
Schools in Oklahoma City